Nick Denis (born October 11, 1983) is a retired Canadian professional mixed martial artist.  A World Victory Road, Aggression Fighting Championship, King of the Cage and UFC veteran, Denis is best known for being a former KOTC Canada Bantamweight Champion, semi-finalist in the Sengoku Featherweight Tournament and his Knockout of the Night victory in his debut fight in the UFC.

Mixed martial arts career

Early career
Denis made his MMA debut in his native Canada in October 2006. He debuted for the King of the Cage Canada promotion and quickly became their Bantamweight champion.

In 2009, Denis made his international MMA debut for the World Victory Road promotion. He fought in the Sengoku Featherweight Grandprix, making it to the semifinal round.

More recently, he fought against Bellator veteran Nick Mamalis who he defeated via KO (suplex and chokeslam) in the second round.

Ultimate Fighting Championship
In early December 2011, it was announced that Denis had signed a multi-fight deal with the UFC.

In his UFC debut, Denis faced Joseph Sandoval on January 20, 2012 at UFC on FX: Guillard vs. Miller.  He was successful, defeating Sandoval with a series of standing elbows.

Nick was expected to face Johnny Bedford at UFC on Fox 3 on May 5, 2012.  However, Bedford was forced out of the bout with an injury and replaced by Roland Delorme. He lost to Delorme by rear-naked choke at 4:59 of an action-packed first round where both fighters were rocked until Delorme rallied and submitted Denis.

In November 2012, Nick announced his retirement from the sport of MMA in a post on his blog, citing research of Chronic traumatic encephalopathy. Denis is frequently quoted and his research is the subject of many discussions on media outlets including MMA Live, The New York Daily News and The Joe Rogan Experience.

Personal life
Denis studied at the University of Ottawa, earning a Bachelor of Science in Biochemistry. Nick also invested part of his "Knockout of the Night" win bonus in purchasing land, owning a large part of land in North Stormont, Ontario, Canada. A fan of board games, Denis has recently designed an algorithm for efficiently playing SeaFall.

Championships and accomplishments
King of the Cage
KOTC Canada Bantamweight Championship (One time)
One successful title defense
Ultimate Fighting Championship
Knockout of the Night (One time) vs. Joseph Sandoval

Mixed martial arts record

|-
| Loss
| align=center| 11–3
| Roland Delorme
| Submission (rear-naked choke)
| UFC on Fox: Diaz vs. Miller
| 
| align=center| 1
| align=center| 4:59
| East Rutherford, New Jersey, United States
| 
|-
| Win
| align=center| 11–2
| Joseph Sandoval
| KO (elbows)
| UFC on FX: Guillard vs. Miller
| 
| align=center| 1
| align=center| 0:22
| Nashville, Tennessee, United States
| 
|-
| Win
| align=center| 10–2
| Nick Mamalis
| KO (suplex and chokeslam)
| Wreck MMA: Unfinished Business
| 
| align=center| 2
| align=center| 1:03
| Gatineau, Quebec, Canada
| 
|-
| Loss
| align=center| 9–2
| Yuji Hoshino
| Submission (guillotine choke)
| World Victory Road Presents: Sengoku Raiden Championships 12
| 
| align=center| 2
| align=center| 0:47
| Tokyo, Japan
| 
|-
| Win
| align=center| 9–1
| Sean Quinn	
| KO (punches)
| Wreck MMA: Fights for the Troops
| 
| align=center| 1
| align=center| 3:42
| Gatineau, Quebec, Canada
| 
|-
| Win
| align=center| 8–1
| Jason Townes	
| TKO (knee and kick to the body)
| AMMA 1: First Blood
| 
| align=center| 2
| align=center| 1:26
| Edmonton, Alberta, Canada
| 
|-
| Loss
| align=center| 7–1
| Marlon Sandro   	 
| KO (punches)
| World Victory Road Presents: Sengoku 8
| 
| align=center| 1
| align=center| 0:19
| Tokyo, Japan
| 
|-
| Win
| align=center| 7–0
| Seiya Kawahara   	 
| TKO (punches)
| World Victory Road Presents: Sengoku 7
| 
| align=center| 1
| align=center| 2:36
| Tokyo, Japan
| 
|-
| Win
| align=center| 6–0
| Josh Kyrejto	
| KO (punch)
| KOTC: Excalibur
| 
| align=center| 1
| align=center| 4:59
| Edmonton, Alberta Canada
| 
|-
| Win
| align=center| 5–0
| Josh Gallant   	  	
| KO (punches)   
| KOTC: Brawl at the Mall 3
| 
| align=center| 2
| align=center| 3:14
| Edmonton, Alberta, Canada
| 
|-
| Win
| align=center| 4–0
| Dave Scholten 	  	
| TKO (punch to the body)   
| KOTC: Brawl at the Mall 2
| 
| align=center| 3
| align=center| 0:23
| Edmonton, Alberta, Canada
| 
|-
| Win
| align=center| 3–0
| Chris Myra
| TKO (punches) 	    	 	
| KOTC: Capital Chaos
| 
| align=center| 1
| align=center| 1:40
| Montreal, Quebec, Canada
| 
|-
| Win
| align=center| 2–0
| Jean-Robert Monier
| Submission (armbar)
| KOTC: Freedom Fight
|  
| align=center| 1
| align=center| 4:33
| Montreal, Quebec, Canada
| 
|-
| Win
| align=center| 1–0
| Justin Darbyson
| KO (punches) 
| APEX: A Night Of Champions
| 
| align=center| 2
| align=center| 2:24
| Montreal, Quebec, Canada
|

See also
List of male mixed martial artists
List of KOTC champions
List of Canadian UFC fighters

References

External links

 
Sengoku profile for Nick Denis

Living people
Canadian male mixed martial artists
Bantamweight mixed martial artists
Featherweight mixed martial artists
Mixed martial artists utilizing Kyokushin kaikan
Mixed martial artists utilizing Brazilian jiu-jitsu
1983 births
Sportspeople from North Bay, Ontario
Canadian practitioners of Brazilian jiu-jitsu
Canadian male karateka
University of Ottawa alumni
Canadian biochemists
Ultimate Fighting Championship male fighters